Kreis Lissa was a district in Regierungsbezirk Posen, in the Prussian province of Posen from 1887 to 1920. Its territory presently lies in the southern part of the Greater Poland Voivodeship in Poland.

History 
On October 1, 1887, the Lissa district was formed from the eastern part of the Fraustadt district. The city of Lissa was the district capital.

On December 27, 1918, the Greater Poland uprising began in the province of Posen, and by January 1919 the north-eastern part of the district around the town of Storchnest was under Polish control. The south-western part of the district, including Lissa and Reisen remained under German control.

On February 16, 1919, an armistice ended the Polish-German fighting, and on June 28, 1919, the German government officially ceded the Lissa district to newly founded Poland with the signing of the Treaty of Versailles. On November 25, 1919, Germany and Poland concluded an agreement on the evacuation and surrender of the areas to be ceded, which was ratified on January 10, 1920. The evacuation of the remaining area under German control including the district town of Lissa and the handover to Poland took place between January 17 and February 4, 1920.

Demographics 
The district had a German majority population, with a significant Polish minority. Most Germans lived in the district town of Lissa. According to the Prussian census of 1905, Kreis Lissa had a population of 42,467, of which 63% were Germans and 37% were Poles.

Military command 
Kreis Lissa was part of the military command in Posen at Glogau, Silesia.

Court system 
The main court was in Ostrowo, with lower court in Lissa.

Civil registry offices 
In 1905, these civil registry offices served the following towns in Kreis Lissa:
Garzyn
Lissa
Murkingen
Reisen
Schwetzkau
Storchnest
Zaborowo

Police districts
In 1905, these police districts served towns in Kreis Lissa:
Lissa Ost (east)
Lissa West
Reisen
Schwetzkau
Storchnest

Catholic churches 
In 1905, these Catholic parish churches served towns in Kreis Lissa:
Alt Laube
Czerwonawies
Deutsch Wilke
Golembitz
Gollmitz
Kankel
Lissa
Murke
Oporowo
Pawlowitz
Punitz
Radomitz
Reisen
Retschke
Schwetzkau
Storchnest
Swierczyn

Protestant churches 
In 1905, Protestant parish churches served towns in Kreis Lissa:
Feuerstein
Lissa
Mohnsdorf
Punitz
Reisen
Storchnest
Ulbersdorf
Wolfskirch
Zaborowo

References

External links 
 List of genealogical records
 Kreis Lissa at Genealogy.Net

Districts of the Province of Posen